Durnevo is a rural locality in Kosteltsevsky Selsoviet Rural Settlement, Kurchatovsky District, Kursk Oblast, Russia. Population:

Geography 
The village is located on the Demina River (a right tributary of the Seym), 67 km from the Russia–Ukraine border, 41 km north-west of Kursk, 12 km north-west of the district center – the town Kurchatov, 8 km from the selsoviet center – Kosteltsevo.

 Climate
Durnevo has a warm-summer humid continental climate (Dfb in the Köppen climate classification).

Transport 
Durnevo is located 32.5 km from the federal route  Crimea Highway, 11 km from the road of regional importance  (Kursk – Lgov – Rylsk – border with Ukraine), 23 km from the road  (Lgov – Konyshyovka), 3 km from the road of intermunicipal significance  (38K-017 – Nikolayevka – Shirkovo), 2 km from the road  (38N-362 – Afanasyevka – Rogovo), on the road  (38N-363 – Durnevo), 11.5 km from the nearest railway halt Kurchatow (railway line Lgov I — Kursk).

The rural locality is situated 46.5 km from Kursk Vostochny Airport, 140 km from Belgorod International Airport and 250 km from Voronezh Peter the Great Airport.

References

Notes

Sources

Rural localities in Kurchatovsky District, Kursk Oblast